Poplarville is a city in Pearl River County, Mississippi, United States. As of the 2010 census, the city population was 2,894. It is the county seat of Pearl River County. It hosts an annual Blueberry Jubilee, which includes rides, craft vendors and rodeos.

History
Poplarville was named for Poplar Jim Smith, the original owner of the town site.

In 1959, Mack Charles Parker, an African-American accused of rape, was abducted from the Pearl River County jail in Poplarville by a mob and shot to death. Despite confessions, no charges were filed against anyone. The mayor of Poplarville told a New York Times reporter, "You couldn't convict the guilty parties if you had a sound film of the lynching." It was the fourth lynching in Poplarville since the Civil War. The case focused national attention on the persistence of lynching in the South and helped accelerate the American Civil Rights Movement.

On August 29, 2005, Hurricane Katrina inflicted heavy damage on the small town. On September 2, 2005, the 1st Battalion, 134th Field Artillery (Ohio Army National Guard) arrived at the National Guard armory in Poplarville to assist the community and Pearl River County in recovery efforts in the wake of Hurricane Katrina. Initial efforts were the security of banks, pharmacies and gas stations as well as initial responses to rural emergencies. The unit stayed for three weeks ultimately checking on every family and structure in the county. On September 5, 2005, Poplarville played host to a visit by George W. Bush, Laura Bush, and Governor Haley Barbour to Pearl River Community College in the aftermath of Hurricane Katrina.

On December 21, 2006, an early morning fire destroyed three downtown buildings.

On March 25, 2014 citizens voted to allow for beer and wine sales. The final vote count was 361 votes for the measure and 149 against.

Geography

Demographics

2020 census

As of the 2020 United States census, there were 2,833 people, 733 households, and 499 families residing in the city.

2000 census
As of the census of 2000, there were 2,601 people, 852 households, and 558 families residing in the city. The population density was 676.5 people per square mile (260.8/km). There were 936 housing units at an average density of 243.4 per square mile (93.9/km). The racial makeup of the city was 74.32% White, 23.95% African American, 0.50% Asian, 0.15% Native American, 0.12% Pacific Islander, 0.15% from other races, and 0.81% from two or more races. Hispanic or Latino of any race were 0.65% of the population.

There were 852 households, out of which 32.5% had children under the age of 18 living with them, 42.6% were married couples living together, 19.0% had a female householder with no husband present, and 34.4% were non-families. 30.5% of all households were made up of individuals, and 15.3% had someone living alone who was 65 years of age or older. The average household size was 2.37 and the average family size was 2.99.

In the city, the population was spread out, with 21.6% under the age of 18, 20.8% from 18 to 24, 22.3% from 25 to 44, 18.2% from 45 to 64, and 17.0% who were 65 years of age or older. The median age was 32 years. For every 100 females, there were 84.9 males. For every 100 females age 18 and over, there were 81.0 males.

The median income for a household in the city was $26,417, and the median income for a family was $32,339. Males had a median income of $35,250 versus $21,667 for females. The per capita income for the city was $12,833. About 20.8% of families and 25.3% of the population were below the poverty line, including 38.8% of those under age 18 and 17.5% of those age 65 or over.

Notable people
 Theodore G. Bilbo, U.S. Senator, was born in 1877 in Juniper Grove, an eastern township of Poplarville.
Jimmy Buffett, musician, lived in Poplarville for a period of time starting in 1959.
Glen Day, PGA Tour Golfer.
Jonathan J.C. Grey, federal judge of the United States District Court for the Eastern District of Michigan
Chapel Hart, country music group.
Whitney Miller, America's first MasterChef.
Mack Charles Parker, African-American victim of lynching in the United States who had been accused of raping a pregnant white woman in northern Pearl River County, Mississippi.
Larkin I. Smith was born in Poplarville in June 1944. In August 1989, Smith died in a plane crash just 7 months after taking office in the U.S. House of Representatives and was succeeded by Democrat Gene Taylor, who would hold that office until his defeat by Republican Steven Palazzo in the 2010 midterm elections. Smith served capacities in both the Harrison and Pearl River County Sheriff's Departments and as Sheriff of Harrison County before being elected to the U.S. Congress.
Martin T. Smith, American lawyer and politician.

Education

The City of Poplarville is served by the Poplarville School District and is home to Pearl River Community College.

References

External links

 
 Official website

Cities in Mississippi
Cities in Pearl River County, Mississippi
County seats in Mississippi